Sergey Alexeyevich Muratov (September 23, 1948—August 27, 2008) was a professional association football coach and a player from Russia.

External links
Career summary by KLISF

1948 births
2008 deaths
Soviet footballers
Soviet football managers
Russian football managers

Association football defenders